Gen. E. O. C. Ord was a United States Army Coast Artillery Corps mine planter built in 1909 by Pusey & Jones of Wilmington, Delaware to an Army Quartermaster Corps design. The mine planter was among the first vessels specifically designed to plant controlled mines in association with coastal fortifications. The first group had been built in 1904 with a second group built in 1909. At the time the vessels were civilian crewed. In 1918 the Army Mine Planter Service of uniformed Army personnel was formed to operate the vessels.

The vessel was constructed by Pusey & Jones as hull number 335, contract 1158 with the hull in very early stage of construction on 8 October 1908, with launching on 13 February 1909.

The steel hull was divided into five compartments by watertight bulkheads with the double bottom running the entire length and also divided into compartments. Fresh water storage was in fore and aft bottom compartments with the ones between used for ballast adjusting draft and trim. A steam and pump brake windlass was located forward for mine handling.

Footnotes

References

External links
 General E. O. C. Ord, mine planter (Pusey and Jones Corporation photograph collection, Hagley Museum and Library, Wilmington, DE)

Ships of the United States Army
Mine planters of the United States Army
United States Army Coast Artillery Corps